A list of films produced in the United Kingdom in 1953 (see 1953 in film):

1953

Documentaries

See also
 1953 in British music
 1953 in British television
 1953 in the United Kingdom

External links
 

1953
Films
British